Saint Viator High School is a private Roman Catholic co-educational secondary school run by the Clerics of Saint Viator in Arlington Heights, Illinois. It was founded by Father Louis Querbes and opened in 1961 to serve as a college-preparatory school for students from the northwest suburbs of Chicago, which is part of the Archdiocese of Chicago.

History
The Archdiocese of Chicago reallocated some land it had already owned — tentatively designated for a future cemetery — for educational purposes, and assigned the Clerics of St. Viator to build and run a boys' secondary school. It opened in 1961 to a small class of freshmen and a few sophomores, graduating its first class in 1965.

Enrollments waxed and waned over the next few decades. Faced with declining numbers in 1987, the choice was made to merge with Sacred Heart of Mary High School of Rolling Meadows, with which Saint Viator already had a sister school relationship.  The merger occurred in the summer of 1987; Saint Viator absorbed the faculty, staff, and student body of Sacred Heart beginning with the 1987–88 school year, and admitted a co-educational freshman class (the class of 1991).

The physical plant remained largely unchanged from its original 1961 footprint. A co-educational student population required the construction of a girls' locker room. This kicked off a string of renovations to occur throughout the 1990s, including a renovation of the boys' locker room, the chapel, and science labs. After a major capital campaign, the school constructed a multipurpose athletic addition, and the Boler Center was dedicated in summer of 2005.  In 2014, the Marie Gallagher Academic Commons was dedicated and in 2015 Fr. Louis Querbes Hall and the new fine arts facilities were dedicated.

Controversy
Since 2007, Saint Viator High School  has used hair samples to test each of its 1,000 students for drugs in the fall and then conduct random screens during the rest of the school year. Starting in 2013, the school will also test for alcohol. 
Private schools have broader legal authority to test students for illegal substances than their public counterparts. And while a few area public high schools do conduct drug testing, the practice is limited to teens in sports or other extracurricular activities. Yet even among private schools, testing students' hair for alcohol use appears to be particularly rare. 
The testing company, Massachusetts-based Psychemedics Corp., said Saint Viator is among a handful nationwide using the company's new hair test for alcohol. At St. Viator, students are notified of their mandatory testing appointments on the morning of the test. At lunchtime, a school official snips off a sample of about 60 hairs from the crown of each chosen student's head. The alcohol test measures ethyl glucuronide, (EtG), to indicate alcohol consumption in the previous three months. The tests take about a week to process and are capable of indicating a minimum average consumption of two to three drinks per week. Students who test positive must attend a meeting with their parents, counselor and the school president. After 90 days the student will be retested, a second positive will result in more serious disciplinary consequences and possible consideration for dismissal from school.  Private schools can in general mandate drug and alcohol tests at their own discretion.

Academics
Saint Viator follows a Christian Catholic Environment.  Students are required to take classes from a breadth of areas, including math, English, fine arts, science, social science, and religion; a foreign language is required for a minimum of two years. Instruction in the Spanish, French, Italian and Mandarin Chinese languages is offered.  Since 2009, German is no longer offered.

17 Advanced Placement courses are offered in English Language, English Literature, Calculus (AB & BC), Spanish Language and Culture, French Language and Culture, Italian Language and Culture, Chinese Language and Culture, Biology, Chemistry, Physics (C), U.S. History, European History, Human Geography, Computer Science Principles, Statistics and World History

The school requires students to complete a fixed number of community service hours in order to graduate. Starting with the class of 2010, students are required to complete 25 community service hours in one year which adds up to 100 service hours for the 4 years.

In 2008, Saint Viator was named a blue ribbon school by the U.S. Department of Education.  It was one of only three private high schools in the country to be recognized as blue ribbon schools.  Again in 2014, the school was recognized as a blue ribbon school.  This time around it was only one of six private high schools in the nation and the only high school in the Archdiocese of Chicago to be recognized.  Since 1996, numerous students from Saint Viator have achieved a 36 on the American College Test, the ACT. In 2016-17, nine students were named National Merit Commended Scholars, five were named National Merit Semi-Finalists, and three were named National Merit Finalists.

Extracurricular activities

Saint Viator offers various academic and leadership societies, such as National Honor Society, Ambassador's Club, Justice League, Math Club, Science Club, The Justice League, Film Club, Champions Club, Anime Club, Students Against Destructive Decisions (SADD), Yearbook, Viator Voice (newspaper), Recycling Corps, Link Crew, Tech Crew and Student Council; foreign language clubs; and Scholastic Bowl. There are also many performing ensembles offered: the Winter Musical (established in 1967), the Fall Play, Concert Band, Symphonic Band, Jazz Band, Musical Pit Orchestra, Pep Band, Concert Choir, Treble Choir, Chamber Singers, Music Ministry, and Orchesis.

Athletics
For most sports, Saint Viator plays in the East Suburban Catholic Conference; for swimming and water polo, the Metro Catholic Aquatics Conference. The Saint Viator hockey team plays in both the Chicago Catholic Hockey League and the Scholastic Hockey League. Saint Viator's athletics have been a very prosperous school in some of their athletic teams. Taking top 3 almost every year in their conference. Soccer is one of these teams being one of few schools with the highest number of state appearances.

The following teams have placed in the top four of their respective sports in state tournaments sponsored by the Illinois High School Association:
 Baseball: State Champions (2017); 4th place (2016); 2nd place (1964–65)
 Golf (boys): 3rd place (1983–84); 2nd place (2006–07); State Champions (2007–08, 2008–09, 2009-10)
 Soccer (boys): 4th place (2014–15); 3rd place (2013–14); 4th place (2001–02); 3rd place (1996–97, 1997–98, 2004–05); 2nd place (2000–01); State Champions (2003–04, 2009–10)
 Soccer (girls): 2nd place (2009–10), State Champions (2001–02, 2002–03, 2004–05);
 Swimming & Diving (boys): 4th place (1973–74)
 Water Polo (boys): 4th place (2001–02)
 Varsity Hockey: 2nd place (1978–1979, 1988–1989, 2011–2012, and 2018-2019)
 Varsity Cheerleading (girls): State Champions (2011–12)

Notable alumni

Brett Basanez (class of 2001) — record-breaking quarterback for Northwestern University; formerly of the Carolina Panthers and Chicago Bears
Emmett Cleary (class of 2008) — offensive tackle for NFL's Detroit Lions
Rory Dames (class of 1991) — head coach of soccer's Chicago Red Stars
Rob Eiter (class of 1985) — 1996 Olympic wrestler
Mike Guendling (class of 1979) — former NFL linebacker
 Cole Kmet (class of 2017), American football player for the Chicago Bears and played collegiately for the Notre Dame Fighting Irish.
Natasha Korecki (class of 1992) — Chicago Sun-Times reporter who has covered high-profile criminal trials
Tommy Madaras (class of 2014) — current Major League Rugby Prop for the Dallas Jackals, who played Rugby at Marquette University
Ted Nugent (class of 1967) — rock star of The Amboy Dukes and Damn Yankees as well as an accomplished solo career;  known for conservative and pro-hunting views
Jarrett Payton (class of 1999) — CFL running back for Montreal Alouettes, media personality and son of Walter Payton
 Raini Rodriguez (class of 2016) — Fiesta Singer Salsa Queen for All of America, media personality and, once again, Raini Rodriguez
Jonathan Spector (class of 2004), soccer player, defender for Orlando City SC (Major League Soccer) and U. S. national team
Brian Stack (class of 1982) — performer and writer on Late Night with Conan O'Brien
 Ben Weasel (Benjamin Foster), founding member and lead singer of punk band Screeching Weasel.

Notable staff
 Ron Feiereisel was a former professional basketball player for the Minneapolis Lakers.  In between coaching jobs at DePaul University, he was the school's first basketball coach.

References

External links
 

School buildings completed in 1961
Educational institutions established in 1961
Catholic secondary schools in Illinois
Roman Catholic Archdiocese of Chicago
Schools in Arlington Heights, Illinois
Private high schools in Cook County, Illinois
1961 establishments in Illinois